Alfred Gerasch (17 August 1877 – 12 August 1955) was a German film actor.

Selected filmography
 The Guilt of Lavinia Morland (1920)
 The Legend of Holy Simplicity (1920)
 The Handicap of Love (1921)
 His Excellency from Madagascar (1922)
 Sins of Yesterday (1922)
 Time Is Money (1923)
 Shadows of the Metropolis (1925)
 The Great Duchess (1926)
 State Attorney Jordan (1926)
 A Modern Dubarry (1927)
 Behind the Altar (1927)
 Queen Louise (1927)
 The Tragedy of a Lost Soul (1927)
 The Lady with the Tiger Skin (1927)
 The Schorrsiegel Affair (1928)
 Yacht of the Seven Sins (1928)
 Odette (1928)
 Spy of Madame Pompadour (1928)
 The Girl from the Provinces (1929)
 Napoleon at Saint Helena (1929)
 Father and Son (1930)
 Reckless Youth (1931)
 1914 (1931)
 Ariane (1931)
 Tannenberg (1932)
 Marshal Forwards (1932)
 Trenck (1932)
 A Thousand for One Night (1933)
 The Happiness of Grinzing (1933)
 Decoy (1934)
 Spring Parade (1934)
 Fridericus (1937)
 The Charm of La Boheme (1937)
 Mother Song (1937)

References

Bibliography
 Chandler, Charlotte. Marlene: Marlene Dietrich, A Personal Biography. Simon and Schuster, 2011.

External links

1877 births
1955 deaths
German male film actors
German male silent film actors
20th-century German male actors
Male actors from Berlin